Project Neptune may refer to:

Project Neptune (water distribution system), a British water distribution system
Project Neptune (National Trust), a project by the National Trust to acquire land on the British coastline